Juri is an upazila of the Moulvibazar District.  In 2001, its population was 122,853. It is located 48 km from District headquarters. The local high school was established in 1930.

History
After the Conquest of Sylhet in 1303, many disciples of Shah Jalal migrated to Juri where they preached the religion of Islam to the local people. Shah Gharib Khaki settled in Bhogtera, Jayfarnagar where his mazar remains and likewise for Shah Abdul-Aliyy Nimatra in Fultola Bazaar, Hazrat Irani in Dakshinbhag and Shah Qasimuddin Jibon Jyoti.

During the Bangladesh Liberation War of 1971, freedom fighters conducted operations in various tea gardens across modern-day Juri. The Pakistani army reached Juri on 2 December and many culverts and bridges were destroyed whilst fighting them. Battles were fought in the areas of Fultola, Sagornal and Kapnapahar. Jagadhari pond (behind Juri High School) is noted as a mass killing site. Juri was liberated on 4 December.

On 26 August 1984, Juri was founded as thana. It became an upazila on 8 January 2005 with eight unions of Kulaura Upazila and Barlekha Upazila, four unions from each of these two Upazilas. The inclusion of two  unions, Dakshinvag and Sunagar, was disputed and was stayed by order of court.

On 12 March 2013, miscreants set fire around Radha Govinda temple in Amtail, Juri. However, the people living around the temple quickly took the fire under control.

Administration
Juri Upazila is divided into six union parishads: Fultola, Gowalbari, Jayfarnagar, Paschim Juri, Purbo Juri, and Sagornal. The union parishads are subdivided into 69 mauzas and 142 villages.

Education

According to Banglapedia, Juri High School, founded in 1930. Other educational institutes in the upazila include Sagornal High School and Sagornal Senior Alim Madrasha Other educational institutes in the upazila include Hazi Monohor Ali M Saifur Rahman High School.

References